Apples and pears may refer to:
 Apples and Pears, a book by Guy Davenport
 Stairs (rhyming slang)

See also
 World Apple and Pear Association
 Apples and oranges (disambiguation)
 Rhyming slang